Larry May is an American philosopher and author. 

May is W. Alton Jones Professor of Philosophy at Vanderbilt University and the author of several books. His theory of international law has been described as "neo-Grotian".

Works

 Crimes against Humanity (Cambridge, 2005)
 War Crimes and Just War (Cambridge, 2007)
Aggression and Crimes against Peace (Cambridge, 2008)
Genocide: A Normative Account (Cambridge, 2010)
Global Justice and Due Process (Cambridge, 2011)
After War Ends: A Philosophical Perspective (Cambridge, 2012)

References

Living people
Vanderbilt University faculty
21st-century American philosophers
International law scholars
Genocide studies scholars
Year of birth missing (living people)